106 Herculis is a variable star in the northern constellation Hercules. It is visible to the naked eye as a faint, red-hued point of light with a baseline apparent visual magnitude of 4.96. The star is moving closer to the Earth with a heliocentric radial velocity of -35 km/s.

Eggleton and Tokovinin (2008) listed this as a suspected binary star system consisting of two roughly equal components. It appears as an ageing red giant with a stellar classification of M0III. This is a suspected semiregular variable star with a very small amplitude and a period of 40 days or more. Having exhausted the supply of hydrogen at its core, it has expanded to 44 times the Sun's radius. It is radiating around 414 times the luminosity of the Sun from its enlarged photosphere at an effective temperature of about 3,789 K.

References

M-type giants
Semiregular variable stars
Hercules (constellation)
Durchmusterung objects
Herculis, 106
168720
089861
6868
Suspected variables